Aishah Hasnie (born ) is an Emmy-nominated Pakistani-American television journalist for Fox News based in New York City who serves as a daytime news correspondent.

Biography
Hasnie was born in Lahore, Pakistan on October 4, 1985.  Many of Hasnie’s relatives in Pakistan are journalists as her mother belongs to the Zuberi family. Her uncle was a lieutenant commander in the U.S. Navy who sponsored her family to emigrate to the United States. She was raised in Bedford, Indiana, where she graduated in 2002 from Bedford North Lawrence High School. Hasnie graduated with a B.A. in journalism from Indiana University, where she was a Dick Yoakam Broadcast Journalism Scholar. During school, she interned as an on-air reporter at WICS-TV in Springfield, Illinois (where her cousin, Maira Ansari, was a reporter), WTHR-TV in Indianapolis, and GEO-TV in Pakistan. After school, she accepted a position as investigative reporter and fill-in anchor at WANE-TV in Fort Wayne, Indiana, where she was nominated for an Emmy Award for an investigative report on voyeurism In 2011, she accepted a position as investigative reporter at WXIN-TV (FOX59) in Indianapolis and also served as anchor of First at Four. In January 2019, she accepted a position at Fox News in New York City as an overnight anchor and news correspondent. In August 2021, she was named congressional correspondent for Fox News.

Hasnie is a religious Muslim, and prays five times a day.

Hasnie has been recognized for her work by the Indiana Associated Press and the Society of Professional Journalists. In 2020, Hasnie was named a New York Woman of Impact by Variety for her coverage of the COVID-19 pandemic. In January 2022, Hasnie began her term as a board member of USA for UNHCR, the UN Refugee Agency.

See also

 New Yorkers in journalism

References

American television reporters and correspondents
Living people
Bedford North Lawrence High School alumni
People from Indiana
American women television journalists
Fox News people
Indiana University alumni
American writers of Pakistani descent
People from Bedford, Indiana
Pakistani emigrants to the United States
1980s births
People from Lahore
21st-century American women
American Muslims